Georgia Konstantinidou (born 29 January 1984) is a Cypriot sport shooter. She competed in the women's trap event at the 2014 Commonwealth Games where she won a silver medal.

References

External links

1984 births
Sportspeople from Limassol
Cypriot female sport shooters
Commonwealth Games silver medallists for Cyprus
Living people
Shooters at the 2014 Commonwealth Games
Commonwealth Games medallists in shooting
European Games competitors for Cyprus
Shooters at the 2019 European Games
21st-century Cypriot women
Medallists at the 2014 Commonwealth Games